Pentheochaetes argentinus is a species of beetle in the family Cerambycidae. It was described by Mendes in 1937.

References

Acanthocinini
Beetles described in 1937